Anna Sergeevna Aleeva-Steker (real name - Alekseeva, married - Steker) (November 15, 1866, Moscow - May 1, 1936, Moscow) - Russian actress. Sister of K. S. Stanislavsky.

Early life 
She was a student and partner of K. S. Stanislavsky in the Alekseevsky circle  and the Society of Art and Literature.

Career 
From 1899 to 1903 she played in the troupe of the Moscow Art Theatre. She performed under the pseudonym Aleeva-Steker.

She played on the stage of the Moscow Art Theatre:

•	Maria Godunova in The Death of Ivan the Terrible by A. K. Tolstoy,

•	Hannu in "Gannel" by Hauptmann,

•	Elena the Beautiful and Spring (once) in Alexander Ostrovsky's The Snow Maiden and other roles.

In the post-revolutionary years she worked in amateur circles in the countryside. She taught rhythm.

She left the theatre due to domestic circumstances.

References

1866 births
1936 deaths
Russian actresses